The French Formula Three Championship was a motor racing series for Formula Three cars held in France between 1964 and 2002. The series was merged with the German Formula Three Championship in 2003 to form the Formula 3 Euro Series.

Champions

External links
French Formula 3 Championship at forix.com

 
1964 establishments in France
2002 disestablishments in France
Recurring sporting events established in 1964
Recurring events disestablished in 2002
Defunct auto racing series
Formula Three series
Defunct sports competitions in France